Burghes is a surname. Notable people with the surname include:

 Arthur Burghes (1848–1916), English cricketer
 Charlotte Burghes, later known as Charlotte Haldane (1894–1969), British author

See also
 Burges
 Burgess (surname)